The Baja California rock squirrel (Otospermophilus atricapillus) is a species of rodent in the family Sciuridae. It is endemic to Baja California, Mexico.

References

Otospermophilus
Rodents of North America
Endemic mammals of Mexico
Endemic fauna of the Baja California Peninsula
Mammals described in 1889
Taxa named by Walter E. Bryant
Taxonomy articles created by Polbot
Taxobox binomials not recognized by IUCN